= One flat =

One flat may refer to:

- F major, a major musical key with one flat
- D minor, a minor musical key with one flat
